On the Great White Trail also known as Renfrew on the Great White Trail is a 1938 American Northern starring James Newill as Sgt. Renfrew of the Royal Mounted in the second of the film series. It was produced and directed by Albert Herman.

Plot summary 
Even in the remote fur trading section of Canada, Sergeant Douglas Renfrew finds a lady in distress. Kay Larkin, whose father is a suspect to a crime. Larkin's partner, along with another Mountie, are found murdered: word came down from the remote region of the Pacific Northwest from Dr. Howe, who resides there. But after finding old man Larkin, and arresting him in the name of the Crown, Renfrew hears his story and suspect's Kay's father is innocent of the charges. Pierre, an employee of a trading post up north, is suspect until Dr. Howe's guilt is revealed. Howe committed the murders and attempted to frame Larkin. The motive was theft and greed that resulted in a murder neither party wanted to be involved, then attempted to cover their tracks.

Production

Replacing Lighting, the police dog from the first Renfrew movie, was another German Shepherd, Silver King, whose screen presence lasted a mere half a dozen movies. Director Al Herman was contracted to direct two Renfrew movies. Because the studio, Grand National Pictures, filed bankruptcy, Criterion acquired the former contract and Herman fulfilled his obligation before departing the poverty row studio for another low-budget entity, Monogram. Herman would go on to direct a number of Tex Ritter westerns.

Cast 
James Newill as Sgt. Renfrew
Terry Walker as Kay Larkin
Robert Frazer as Andrew Larkin
Richard Alexander as Doc Howe
Richard Tucker as Inspector Newcom
Bob Terry as Sergeant Kelly
Eddie Gribbon as RCMP Constable Patsy
Walter McGrail as Garou
Philo McCullough as Henchman Williams
Charles King as Henchman LaGrange
Juan Duval as Henchman Pierre
Victor Potel as Lyons
Silver King the Dog as King, Renfrew's Dog

Soundtrack 
 James Newill - "Mounted Men" (Written by Betty Laidlaw and Robert Lively)
 James Newill - "You're Beautiful" (Written by Lew Porter)
 James Newill - "Je T'aime" (Written by Lew Porter and Bob Taylor)

See also 
 Renfrew of the Royal Mounted (1937)
 Sky Bandits (1940)
 Danger Ahead (1940)
 Yukon Flight (1940)

References

External links 

1938 films
1930s action adventure films
Royal Canadian Mounted Police in fiction
Films set in Canada
American black-and-white films
Grand National Films films
American Western (genre) films
American action adventure films
1938 Western (genre) films
Films directed by Albert Herman
Films with screenplays by Joseph F. Poland
1930s English-language films
1930s American films